Ben Westbeech is a British DJ and record producer originating from Hertfordshire who spent his formative musical years in Bristol. Trained as cellist and vocalist, his influences include house, soul, jazz and hip hop.

Music career

Early career: 2007–08
Westbeech gave a CD containing his first single "So Good Today" to a friend in London. Two months later she played it to Gilles Peterson who snapped it up. This led to him being signed to Gilles Peterson's new label, Brownswood Recordings. His debut album Welcome to the Best Years of Your Life was released in March 2007. He later appeared on Later... with Jools Holland alongside Paul McCartney and Björk. He also appeared on the track "Squeeze Me" on Kraak & Smaak's album Plastic People, released in April 2008.

There's More To Life Than This: 2009–11
More recently, he appeared on the track "I Can See", which was the main single for Jazzanova's album titled Of All The Things, released in January 2009 on Verve/Universal. Ben also sang on the song "Shame" for DJ Marky and Artificial Intelligence. Westbeech is working with Professor Green (producing for his new record), Kutz (Soul Jazz), Redlight (Lobster Boy) and Rusko (Mad Decent). He released his second album, There's More To Life Than This on Strictly Rhythm in September 2011. The record features collaborators including Soul Clap, Henrik Schwarz, MJ Cole, Motor City Drum Ensemble and Georg Levin. Westbeech described it as "house inspired, rather than straight up house music". Westbeech also produces and DJs under the moniker Breach. Under the "Breach" moniker, he produced the track "Fatherless" released on PTN in 2010. Breach has released music on Claude VonStroke's Dirtybird label and Pet's (Catz n Dogz' label). Westbeech also wrote the vocal for Redlight's Breakthrough hit "Get Out My Head" featuring Nicole Jackson.  He also owns the record label "Naked Naked" which releases tracks from Breach, Midland, Dusky and Dark Sky.

2013–present: Breakthrough
In June 2013, Westbeech's remix of Maya Jane Coles' "Everything" featuring Karin Park was released through I/AM/ME.

In July 2013, under the name "Breach" he released his first successful single on the UK Singles Chart, "Jack", peaking at 9. The follow up single, "Everything You Never Had (We Had It All)" featuring Andreya Triana, also peaked at 9.

Breach teamed up with American singer-songwriter Kelis on the track "The Key", which was released on 14 December 2014, the week of the UK Christmas singles chart race; the single however failed to chart.

Personal life
Westbeech was briefly engaged to actress Rachel Hurd-Wood.

Discography

Albums

Singles

Other songs
"Get Closer" (12") 
"So Good Today" (12") 
"So Good Today (Domu Remixes)" (12", Promo)
"So Good Today (Osunlade Remixes)" (12")  
"So Good Today" / "Beauty" (12")    
"Dance With Me (MJ Cole / Switch Remixes)" (12") 
"Hang Around (Remixes)" (12")     
"Hang Around" / "Pusherman" (7", Promo)  
"Something for the Weekend"
"Falling" (Strictly Rhythm)
"Let's Get Hot" (2013)
"You Won't Find Love Again" (2013)

Samples
"Get Silly" samples Ray Barretto's cover of Stevie Wonder's song Pastime Paradise
"Stop What You're Doing" samples Dionne Warwick's Wives And Lovers
"Get Closer" samples Linda Williams'  Elevate Your Mind
"Pusherman" samples Lover's Theme by Bob Cunningham

References

External links
 – official site

Ben Westbeech interview at Basic Soul

Musicians from Bristol
Living people
1981 births
Musicians from Hertfordshire
Brownswood Recordings artists
DJs_from_Bristol